Arsen Hajdari (born 25 February 1989) is an Albanian football player who plays for Besëlidhja in the Albanian First Division.

References

1989 births
Living people
Footballers from Shkodër
Albanian footballers
Association football forwards
KS Ada Velipojë players
KF Drenica players
KF Vllaznia Shkodër players
Besëlidhja Lezhë players
Kategoria e Parë players
Kategoria Superiore players
Albanian expatriate footballers
Expatriate footballers in Kosovo
Albanian expatriate sportspeople in Kosovo